The Women's 70 kg event at the 2010 South American Games was held on March 19.

Medalists

Results

Round Robin

Contests

References

 Report

W70
South American Games 2010
South American Games W70